Cartimandua or Cartismandua (reigned ) was a 1st-century queen of the Brigantes, a Celtic people living in what is now northern England.  She came to power around the time of the Roman conquest of Britain, and formed a large tribal agglomeration that became loyal to Rome.  The only account of her is by the Roman historian Tacitus, through which she appears to have been widely influential in early Roman Britain.

Her name may be a compound of the Common Celtic roots *carti- "chase, expel, send" and *mandu- "pony".

History
Although Cartimandua is first mentioned by Tacitus in AD 51, her rule over the Brigantes may have already been established when the Roman emperor Claudius began the organised conquest of Britain in 43: she may have been one of the eleven "kings" who Claudius's triumphal arch says surrendered without a fight. If not, she may have come to power after a revolt of a faction of the Brigantes was defeated by Publius Ostorius Scapula in 48.

Being of "illustrious birth", according to Tacitus, Cartimandua probably inherited her power, as she does not appear to have obtained it through marriage. She and her husband, Venutius, are described by Tacitus as loyal to Rome and "defended by our [Roman] arms". In 51, the British resistance leader Caratacus sought sanctuary with Cartimandua after being defeated by Ostorius Scapula in Wales, but Cartimandua handed him over to the Romans in chains.

Having given Claudius the greatest exhibit of his triumph, Cartimandua was rewarded with great wealth. She later divorced Venutius, replacing him with his armour-bearer, Vellocatus. In 57, although Cartimandua had seized his brother and other relatives and held them hostage, Venutius made war against her and then against her Roman protectors. He built alliances outside the Brigantes, and during the governorship of Aulus Didius Gallus (52–57) he staged an invasion of the kingdom of the Brigantes. The Romans had anticipated this and sent some cohorts to defend their client queen. The fighting was inconclusive until Caesius Nasica arrived with a legion, the IX Hispana, and defeated the rebels. Cartimandua retained the throne thanks to prompt military support from Roman forces.

She was not so fortunate in 69. Taking advantage of Roman instability during the year of four emperors, Venutius staged another revolt, again with help from other nations. Cartimandua appealed for troops from the Romans, who were only able to send auxiliaries. Cartimandua was evacuated, leaving Venutius in control of a kingdom at war with Rome. After this, Cartimandua disappears from the sources.

Representation by Tacitus
In his Annals and the Histories, Tacitus presents Cartimandua in a negative light. Although he refers to her loyalty to Rome, he invites the reader to judge her "treacherous" role in the capture of Caratacus, who had sought her protection; her "self-indulgence"; her sexual impropriety in rejecting her husband in favour of a common soldier; and her "cunning stratagems" in taking Venutius' relatives hostage. However, he also consistently names her as a queen (regina), the only one such known in early Roman Britain. Boudica, the only other female British leader of the period, is not described in these terms.

One of the later mediaeval Welsh triads likewise mentions "treachery" against Caratacus (Caradoc) by one Aregwedd Foeddawg whom some identify with Cartimandua: in a garbled account, Caradoc is made a son of Brân the Blessed who is named as one of the "Three Blessed Kings" for introducing Christianity to the Britons after captivity in Rome.

References

Delamarre, Xavier (2003). Dictionnaire de la Langue Gauloise, Editions Errance.

Further reading
Howarth, Nicki (2008), Cartimandua, Queen of the Brigantes (Stroud: The History Press).
Salmonson, Jessica Amanda (1991), The Encyclopedia of Amazons, Paragon House, page 50.
Braund, David (1996), Ruling Roman Britain: Kings, Queens, Governors, and Emperors from Julius Caesar to Agricola (New York: Routledge).

External links
The Heroic Age: Brigantia, Cartimandua and Gwenhwyfar

1st-century women rulers
1st-century monarchs in Europe
Celtic women
Briton rulers
Queens regnant in the British Isles
Roman client rulers
Women in 1st-century warfare
Women in ancient European warfare
Women in war in Britain